The Directorate-General for Education, Youth, Sport and Culture (DG EAC; formerly the Directorate-General for Education and Culture) is a Directorate-General of the European Commission.

The Education, Youth, Sport and Culture Directorate-General is responsible of policies in the field of education, youth, culture, languages, and sport.

Structure

DG EAC is divided into 5 "directorates":

 Directorate A : Policy Strategy and Evaluation
 Directorate B : Youth, Education and Erasmus+
 Directorate C : Innovation, International Cooperation and Sport
 Directorate D : Culture and Creativity
 Directorate R : Performance Management, Supervision and Resources

It oversees the European Union's Education, Audiovisual and Culture Executive Agency (EACEA), which handles most operational programmes on DG EAC's behalf.

See also
 European Commissioner for Innovation, Research, Culture, Education and Youth
 Education in the European Union
 European Higher Education Area
 Bologna process
 Erasmus programme
 Cultural policies of the European Union
 European Capital of Culture
 Culture of Europe
 Town twinning

References

External links 
 Directorate-General for Education and Culture
 The Official European Higher Education Area website 2010-2020

Cultural organizations based in Europe
Education and Culture
European Union youth policy